Allari Subhashini (born Tirumala Subhashini) is an Indian actress predominantly appears in Telugu films and TV serials. She plays supporting roles.

Personal life
She hails from Bhimavaram, Andhra Pradesh. She lost her father when she was attending school. She studied up to 7th standard. After that She got married at a very young age. She has a sister. She was a stage artist from her childhood.

Career
When she visited Hyderabad for a stage drama called Chintamani, actor Chalapati Rao advised her to approach his son Ravi Babu who was making a debut film called Allari. He offered her a role in that film. Her debut film gave her good recognition. Later she changed her name to Allari Subhashini. She received many offers after that. She played significant roles in Sri Anjaneyam directed by Krishna Vamsi. She went on to act with stars like Balakrishna, NTR, Nagarjuna, Chiranjeevi, and Rajinikanth.

Filmography

Allari (2002)
Chennakesava Reddy (2002)
Eeswar (2002)
Sri Anjaneyam (2004)
Kanchanamala Cable TV (2005)
Kithakithalu (2006)
Sathyabhama (2007) as Restaurant manager
Nachavule (2008)
Bendu Apparao R.M.P (2009)
Amaravathi (2009)
Money Money, More Money (2011)
Aakasame Haddu (2011)
Sudigadu (2012)
Surya vs Surya (2015)
Guntur Talkies (2016)
Parvathipuram (2016) as Ranganayaki

References

Year of birth missing (living people)
Living people
Actresses from Andhra Pradesh
Actresses in Telugu cinema
People from West Godavari district
21st-century Indian actresses
Indian film actresses
Indian television actresses
Actresses in Telugu television
Indian actresses